This is a list of Deakin University people, including notable alumni and staff.

Notable alumni

Business
 Adinda Cresheilla, businesswoman, Indonesian G20 Ambassador, fashion model, Puteri Indonesia Pariwisata 2022 and Miss Supranational Indonesia 2022: BA in Communication
 Simon Garlick, CEO of the Western Bulldogs: BExSc
 Carolyn Hardy, CEO UNICEF Australia: BA, MA
 Princess Jahnavi Kumari of Mewar, Family Office Private Equity Investment Management 
 Christopher Lynch, former Chief Financial Officer & Former Director of BHP, CEO of Transurban: BCom, MBA
 Michael Malouf, former Chief Executive Officer, Carlton Football Club: MBA
 Lindsay Maxsted, Chairman Westpac
 Jim Stynes OAM, businessman and Chairman of Melbourne Football Club: BEd
 Diana Taylor Prominent Businesswoman

Government

Politicians

Federal politicians
 Mark Butler MP, Federal Member for Port Adelaide
 Trish Crossin, Senator for Northern Territory
 Bridget McKenzie, Senator for Victoria, Deputy Leader of the Nationals
 Catherine King MP, Federal Member for Ballarat: LLB
 Michael Sukkar MP, Federal Member for Deakin
 Libby Coker MP, Federal Member for Corangamite
 Helen Haines MP, Federal Member for Indi
 Raff Ciccone, Senator for Victoria
 Dave Sharma MP, Federal Member for Wentworth

Australian state and territory politicians
 Julie Attwood,  Member of Legislative Assembly of Queensland: Graduate Certificate of Case Management and Client Service (1995)
 John Brumby, former Premier and Treasurer of the State of Victoria: Dip Ed
 Josh Bull, Member of Legislative Assembly of Victoria: Country Newspaper Journalism
 Georgie Crozier, Member of Legislative Council of Victoria: BN (1994), GradCert Diabetes Education (1994)
 Matt Fregon, Member of Legislative Assembly of Victoria: Bachelor of Business (Computing) (1992)
 Mark Gepp, Member of Legislative Council of Victoria: GradCert (2009)
 Danielle Green, Member of Legislative Assembly of Victoria: BA (1993) 
 Peter Gutwein, Premier of the State of Tasmania
 John Hyde,  Member of Legislative Assembly of Western Australia First openly gay man to be elected to the Western Australian parliament
 Andrew Katos,  Former Member of Legislative Assembly of Victoria
 Denis Napthine, Premier of the State of Victoria: MBA
 Lisa Neville,  Member of Legislative Assembly of Victoria: LLB (1999)
 Craig Ondarchie, Member of Legislative Council of Victoria
 Jaala Pulford, Member of Legislative Council of Victoria: MPol&Policy (2015)
 Tim Richardson, Member of Legislative Assembly of Victoria: LLB/BCom (2012)
 Adem Somyurek,  Member of Legislative Council of Victoria: MPol&Policy
 Nina Springle, Former Member of Legislative Council of Victoria, Former Deputy Leader of the Victorian Greens
 Jaclyn Symes, Member of Legislative Council of Victoria, LLB (2002)

International politicians
  Mahmoud Saikal, Permanent representative of Afghanistan to the UN

Public servants
 Neil Comrie, former Chief Commissioner of Victoria Police: BA (Police Studies)

Humanities

Arts
 Anurag Singh (director), Pollywood and Bollywood director 
Rodger Corser, Australian actor: Honours B.A in Media Studies
 Tony Ellwood, Director of the National Gallery of Victoria and former director of Queensland Art Gallery and Gallery of Modern Art: M.App.Sc.(Museum Studies)
 Oliver Feltham, contemporary philosopher and English translator of Alain Badiou's Being and Event (2006)
 Mandawuy Yunupingu, indigenous musician, community leader and  Australian of the Year (1992): BA
 Nitya Prakash, Bestselling Author

Journalism
 Emma Alberici, journalist/presenter with the ABC
 Livinia Nixon, Nine Network weather presenter: BCom, BA
 Leigh Sales, ABC journalist, anchor of 7.30 and author: Master of International Relations, Brisbane Writers Festival.
 Stella Young, comedian, journalist and disability rights activist: BA
 Nathan Templeton, former 10 News First sports reporter and now the Melbourne correspondent on Sunrise

Sport
 Jakara Anthony, skier
 Jimmy Bartel, 2007 Brownlow Medallist and triple AFL Premiership Player in 2007, 2009 and 2011 with the Geelong Football Club. 2011 Norm Smith medallist
 Kristina Bates, field hockey player
 Mark Blake, 2009 AFL Premiership player with the Geelong Football Club
 Belle Brockhoff, snowboarder
 Campbell Brown, 2008 AFL Premiership player with Hawthorn Football Club and inaugural Gold Coast Football Club player: BCom (Sports Management)
 Tim Callan, AFL footballer with the Western Bulldogs: BCom
 Briony Cole, Gold medalist, 2006 Commonwealth Games, & Silver medalist, 2008 Beijing Olympics
 Peter Daniel, former footballer for Essendon Football Club, AFL: DipTeach
 Ben Graham, former Geelong Football Club star, now a punter for the Arizona Cardinals of the National Football League; first Australian to play in the Super Bowl: BCom
 Tom Harley, Dual Premiership Captain of Geelong Football Club in 2007 and 2009: BCom
 Dean Hewitt, curler
 Geoff Hunt, World Champion squash player: Charles William apeGrad Dip (Nutrition)
 Michael Klinger, Australian cricketer
 Carmen Marton, Australia's first ever world taekwondo champion
 Ezi Magbegor, basketballer
 Mat McBriar, punter for the Dallas Cowboys of the National Football League
 Alex Pearce, Australian rules footballer
 Nathan Pellissier, table tennis player
 Henry Playfair, AFL footballer with the Sydney Swans: BCom
 Jeff Rowley, surfer and celebrity speaker: MBA in leadership and communications.
 Matt Stevic, AFL umpire
 Jack Viney, Australian rules footballer
 Breann Moody, Australian rules footballer

Other
 
 Phillip Aspinall, Primate of the Anglican Church in Australia: MBA
 Colonel Benito T. de Leon, Military Officer, Philippines Army: MA (Strategic Studies)
 Arthur Vivian Lucas Jones, Bishop of the Anglican Church in Australia
 Major General Mark Kelly, Officer of the Australian Army: Grad.Dip. Defence Studies
 James Kilgore, as Charles William Pape, member of the Symbionese Liberation Army: PhD
 Mary Macken-Horarik, linguist
 Sally-Anne McCormack, Australian clinical psychologist
 Anika Molesworth, agroecology scientist
 Kathryn Sheffield, remote sensing, BS
 Christopher Sonn, social psychologist, GDed. (Victoria College)

Notable staff
Kevin Anderson, filmmaker
Kate Buchanan ARC Future Fellow
Tania de Koning-Ward, Commonwealth Health Minister's Medal for Excellence in Health and Medical Research
Peter Hodgson, 2009 Australian Laureate Fellow
John Jonas, Birks Professor of Metallurgy, McGill University: Visiting Professor.
Ross Oakley, former Australian Football League CEO: Adjunct Professor in the Faculty of Business and Law
David Parkin, former coach of Carlton and Hawthorn Football Clubs: Lecturer in Exercise Science.
Mark Weinberg, Chief Justice of Norfolk Island: Adjunct Professor, School of Law.
Jim Kennan, former politician, Adjunct Professor of Law
Svetha Venkatesh, Director of the Centre for Pattern Recognition and Data Analytics

Administration

Chancellors

Vice-Chancellors

References

Education in Geelong
Universities in Victoria (Australia)
Universities in Melbourne